The Roman Catholic Council of Albi was held in 1254 by St. Louis on his return from his unlucky Crusade, under the presidency of Zoen, Bishop of Avignon and Papal Legate for the final repression of the Albigenses, the reformation of clergy and people and the Church's relation to the Jewish people.

References

Albi
Albi